Liceo de San Pablo, formerly Ateneo de San Pablo, is a private, Catholic basic education institution run by the Catholic  Diocese of San Pablo in San Pablo City, Laguna, Philippines

History 
In 1967, the Diocese of San Pablo was created, separate from the Lipa Diocese. The diocesan officials thought it logical that the site for the seminary and diocesan curia be in San Pablo. After the creation of the diocese, the newly appointed bishop, Most Rev. Pedro N. Bantigue, D.D. asked the Society of Jesus to redonate the Ateneo building site to the diocese. The Jesuits agreed to execute a deed of redonation and the signing of the deed was scheduled on March 11, 1969. The Ateneans and many sympathizers staged rallies and demonstrations to prevent the signing of the contract and they succeeded.

The following year, the Ateneo de San Pablo was again threatened by the same case of 1969. On February 26, 1977, the Rome Supreme Tribunal ordered the Jesuits to comply with the redonation agreement made previously with Bishop Bantigue. The signing of the contract was rescheduled for June 15, 1977. In April of the same year, the Jesuits received a letter from Rome explaining the order for the Jesuits to leave the Ateneo site and informing them that the Bishop will pay P850,000.00 as compensation for the improvements made by them on the site.

The Ateneo community tried to prevent the signing of the deed but to no avail this time. The deed was signed and the ownership of the land and the buildings of the Ateneo was transferred to the Diocese. The twenty-eighth and last graduation day in the Ateneo de San Pablo was held on March 31, 1978, marking the end of a beloved institution. The Ateneo de San Pablo became the Liceo de San Pablo, a parochial school of the Diocese.

Vision Statement (Before 2022)

Liceo de San Pablo is a Catholic Institution of Learning which commits herself to prepare the Liceans as agents of Evangelization and Social Transformation through Holistic Christian Formation of Quality of life.

Mision Statement (Before 2022)

We the Liceans commit ourselves to the attainment of academic excellence, promotion of Christian values, and improvement of quality of life for social transformation through quality Catholic education and by being "MakaDiyos", "MakaTao", "MakaBayan" and "MakaKalikasan".

References

External links 

 

Schools in San Pablo, Laguna
Educational institutions established in 1967